Lake Washington Rowing Club (LWRC) is an organization in the greater Seattle area to further the sport of rowing.  It trains people ranging in experience from beginners to Olympic-caliber rowers.  The club emphasizes mastery of boat-handling skills and values sculling as the principal path to excellence in all types of rowing.

External links
http://lakewashingtonrowing.com/

Rowing clubs in the United States
Sports in Seattle